Marcel Lopuchovský (born 2 May 1977 in Košice) is a Slovak athlete who competed in the late 1990s and early 2000s before switching to bobsleigh in 2005.

Athletic career
As an athlete, Lopuchovský competed in the 400 m event. He qualified for the 2000 Summer Olympics in Sydney in the men's 4 × 400 m relay, but was eliminated in the first round.

Bobsleigh career
Switching to bobsleigh in 2005, Lopuchovský competed in the 2010 Winter Olympics in Vancouver, but crashed out during the first run of the four-man event. His best World Cup finish was 20th in a four-man event in Lake Placid, New York in November 2009.

References
 
 

1977 births
Living people
Sportspeople from Košice
Slovak male bobsledders
Slovak male sprinters
Olympic athletes of Slovakia
Athletes (track and field) at the 2000 Summer Olympics
Olympic bobsledders of Slovakia
Bobsledders at the 2010 Winter Olympics